Gaunpalika is the newly formed lower administrative division in Nepal. This administrative division was established in 2017, and replaced the existing village development committees. There are currently 460 rural municipalities.

This is a list of the Gaunpalika or rural municipalities of Nepal published by the Ministry of Federal Affairs and General Administration.

Classification 
The Ministry of Federal Affairs and General Administration has classified the local units into four grades based on infrastructure and social development.

Koshi Pradesh

There are a total of 88 Rural municipalities in Koshi Pradesh spread in 14 districts.
Sunkoshi is a name of three rural municipalities in Nepal, in which one Sunkoshi rural municipality falls in Province No. 1: Sunkoshi, Okhaldhunga
Likhu is a name of rural municipality for three rural municipalities in Nepal, in which 1 Likhu falls in Province No. 1 in Okhaldhunga District (see:Likhu, Okhaldhunga). There is another rural municipality Likhu Pike in Solukhumbu District.
Miklajung is a name for two different rural municipality in Nepal, and both are in Province No. 1 (Miklajung, Morang and Miklajung, Panchthar)
Yangbarak in Taplejung is now Pathibhara Yangwarak, since there is another Yangwarak in Panchthar
Kamal is the most populous rural municipality in Province No. 1 with 44,365 individuals and Likhu Pike is the least populous rural municipality with 5,534 peoples.

Madhesh Pradesh 
There are total 59 rural municipalities in Province No. 2 spread in 8 districts.
Sonama is the most populous rural municipality in Province No. 2 with 38,747 individuals and Bishnupur in Siraha District is the least populous rural municipality with 18,522 peoples.
 There are three Aurahi in Province No. 2 in which two Aurahi, Dhanusa & Aurahi, Siraha are rural & Aurahi, Mahottari is urban municipality
 There is a Bishnu in Sarlahi District and two Bishnupur (Bishnupur, Saptari) & (Bishnupur, Siraha)
 Prasauni and Sakhuwa Prasauni are two different rural municipality. (Not to be confused between Prasauni and Parsauni)

Bagmati Province 
There are 74 rural municipalities in Bagmati Province spread in 13 districts.
Bakaiya is the most populous rural municipality in Bagmati Province with 39,620 individuals and Aamachhodingmo is the least populous rural municipality with 5,490 peoples.
Bagmati Rural Municipality is the name of two rural municipalities located in Lalitpur District and Makwanpur District (viz. Bagmati, Lalitpur and Bagmati, Makwanpur), while there is a municipality in Province No. 2 (Bagmati, Sarlahi).
Likhu, Nuwakot & Likhu Tamakoshi are two different rural municipalities in Bagmati Province, while Likhu, Okhaldhunga and Likhu Pike are located in Province No. 1
Sunkoshi, Sindhupalchok and Sunkoshi, Sindhuli are located in Bagmati Province while Sunkoshi, Okhaldhunga is in Province No. 1.
There are two Tripurasundari rural municipalities in Bagmati Province (viz. Tripurasundari, Dhading and Tripurasundari, Sindhupalchok). For a municipality in Karnali Province, see Tripurasundari, Dolpa.

Gandaki Province 
There are 58 rural municipalities in Gandaki Province spread in 11 districts.
 Badigad is the most populous rural municipality with population of 30,906, while Narpa Bhumi is the least populous rural municipality with only 538 people. 
 There are two Annapurna Rural Municipalities in Gandaki province, one in Kaski District (Annapurna Rural Municipality, Kaski and another in Myagdi District (Annapurna Rural Municipality, Myagdi).
 Gandaki Province has a rural municipality with same name (Gandaki Rural Municipality)
 There are two Kaligandaki Rural Municipalities, one in Syangja District (Kaligandaki, Syangja) of Gandaki Province while other Kaligandaki belongs to Lumbini Province (Kaligandaki, Gulmi).
 There are two Malika Rural Municipalities, one in Myagdi District (Malika, Myagdi) of Gandaki Province while other Malika belongs to Lumbini Province (Malika, Gulmi).

Lumbini Province 
There are 73 rural municipalities in Lumbini Province.
 Raptisonari is the largest rural municipality of Lumbini by area and population both.
 There are two Mayadevi Rural Municipalities in Lumbini, one in Rupandehi (Mayadevi, Rupandehi) and another in Kapilbastu (Mayadevi, Kapilvastu).

Karnali Province 
There are 54 rural municipalities in Karnali Province.

Barahatal is the most populous rural municipality in Karnali with 26,802 individuals and Chharka Tangsong is the least populous rural municipality with 1451 individuals only.

Sudurpashchim Province 
There are 54 rural municipalities in Sudurpashchim Province.

Janaki is the most populous rural municipality in Sudurpashchim with 48,540 individuals.

See also 
 Village development committee (VDCs)
 List of cities in Nepal
 Local self-government in Nepal

References

External links

.01
Gaunpalikas, List
Gaunpalikas, List
Lists of subdivisions of Nepal

Gaunpalikas, List
Village development committees (Nepal)